The Penguin Podcast is a fortnightly podcast by Penguin Books.

Authors talk about objects that have special meanings.

Initially the host was Richard E. Grant. He stepped down in November 2016 and the series was re-launched with guest hosts conducting the interviews.

The podcasts are hosted in iTunes, Acast and SoundCloud.

The show won "Best Branded Podcast" at the 2020 British Podcast Awards.

Episode list

References

British podcasts
Book podcasts